The Keyboard Variations No. 5 in C major, Hob. XVII/5, is a set of Keyboard variations written by Joseph Haydn in 1790 and published by Artaria & Co. on February 9, 1791.

Structure 

The work features a theme and six variations.  

 Thema (Andante)
 Var. I
 Var. II
 Var. III
 Var. IV.
 Var. V. (Minore in C minor)
 Var. VI (Maggiore)

Notable recordings 

Tom Beghin's The Virtual Haydn: Complete Works for Solo Keyboard.

References

External links 

Joseph Haydn, The Virtual Haydn, Tom Beghin, Naxos 8.501203, CD, 2011

Compositions by Joseph Haydn
Variations
Compositions for solo piano
Compositions in C major
1790 compositions